Edward Partington, 1st Baron Doverdale    (28 September 1836 – 5 January 1925) was an English industrialist.

Partington was born in Bury, Greater Manchester, the son of Sarah Partington and David Livsey, a blacksmith, and arrived in Glossop in 1874. He, with his partner William Olive, bought the Turn Lee Mill from Thomas Hamer Ibbotson. He bought it to try out a modern method of paper manufacture using the sulfite process.  He expanded rapidly with mills in Salford and Barrow in Furness. He merged with Kellner of Vienna and was created Lord Doverdale in 1914. His factories in Charlestown created nearly a 1000 jobs. He employed a thousand workers in his Charlestown Mill, 1 in 12 of the working population. He was a Unitarian and a Liberal. He was a Deputy Lieutenant of Derbyshire. He was made a Baron in the 1916 Prime Minister's Resignation Honours, being created Baron Doverdale, of Westwood Park in the County of Worcester on 6 January 1917.

He died suddenly a few hours after visiting his mills one afternoon in 1925.

References

1836 births
1925 deaths
Mill owners in Glossop
English industrialists
Deputy Lieutenants of Derbyshire
People from Bury, Greater Manchester
Barons in the Peerage of the United Kingdom
Barons created by George V